Maqna'a is a sub-district located in al-Sha'ar District, Ibb Governorate, Yemen. Maqna'a had a population of 3562 according to the 2004 census.

References 

Sub-districts in Ash Sha'ar District